Vitaliano Brancati (24 July 1907 – 25 September 1954) was an Italian novelist, dramatist, poet and screenwriter.

Biography
Born in Pachino, Syracuse,  Brancati studied in Catania, where he graduated in letters and where he spent the most part of his life. While he started writing at young age and at 25 years old he was already the author of six books, which were largely influenced by fascist ideals and which were later rejected by the same Brancati, critics tend to set the starting point of his career in 1935, when he released the collection of short stories In search of a cause. Brancati got his first and probably major success in 1941, with the novel Don Giovanni in Sicilia, a vibrant and humorous portrait of the Sicilian temperament.

In 1944 he wrote the novel Gli anni perduti ("The Lost Years"), a bold satire of Benito Mussolini's megalomania, and in 1946 Vecchio con gli stivali ("Old Man in Boots"), a satirical short story inspired by the vicissitudes of the Italian fascism which won the Vendemmia Award and which was adapted into a successful film, Difficult Years by Luigi Zampa. In 1950 he won the Bagutta Prize with one another well-known novel, Il bell'Antonio ("The Handsome Antonio"). He was one of the contributors of a cultural magazine, Omnibus.

He died in a clinic in Turin after a major surgery. He was married to actress Anna Proclemer and the couple had a daughter together.

Selected works

Novels and short stories
 Don Giovanni in Sicilia (1941), adapted into the film internationally released as Don Juan in Sicily (1967)
 Gli anni perduti (1944) (The Lost Years (1992), trans. Patrick Creagh)
 Il bell'Antonio (1949) (Antonio: The Great Lover (1952), Beautiful Antonio (1993), trans. Patrick Creagh); adapted into the film Il bell'Antonio (1960)
 Vecchio con gli stivali (1946), a short story, adapted into the film Anni difficili (Difficult Years) (1948)

Screenplays
 La bella addormentata (Sleeping Beauty) (1942)
 Don Cesare di Bazan (1942)
 Gelosia (Jealousy) (1942)
 Signori, in carrozza! (Rome-Paris-Rome) (1951)
 È più facile che un cammello... (His Last Twelve Hours) (1951)
 Anni facili (Easy Years) (1953)
 L'arte di arrangiarsi (The Art of Getting Along) (1954)
 Paolo il caldo (Hot Paolo) (1955)

References

Further reading

 Sarah Zappulla Muscarà (edited by), Vitaliano Brancati, Catania, Giuseppe Maimone Editore, 1986. .
 Sarah Zappulla Muscarà (edited by), Narratori siciliani del secondo dopoguerra, Catania, Giuseppe Maimone Editore, 1990. .

1907 births
1954 deaths
Writers from Sicily
People from the Province of Syracuse
Italian dramatists and playwrights
20th-century Italian screenwriters
20th-century Italian novelists
20th-century Italian male writers
20th-century Italian dramatists and playwrights
Italian male novelists
Italian male dramatists and playwrights
University of Catania alumni
Italian male screenwriters